is a Japanese gravure idol, belonging to the show-business production Plaisir, subsequently ACE.

Activities

TV Programs 
 Mizugi Shojo (水着少女), TV Tokyo
 Tokyo Biyu (東京美優), TV Tokyo

DVDs 
 Pearl, Vega Factory 2003
 Pure Smile Risa Shimamoto, Takeshobo 2004
 Sweet Milk, Line Communications 2004
 Jonetsu (情熱), E-net Fronteer 2004
 Milk Shake, Line Communications 2005
 Muku -innocent world- (無垢 -i.w.-), GP Museum Soft 2005
 Mizugi Samurai (水着サムライ), GP Museum Soft 2005
 LHICHA de GO, E-net Fronteer 2005

Bibliography

Photo books 
 Ichigo Juice (15果実), Bauhaus 2003
 Strawberry (ストロベリー), Angel-X - digital
 RI-CHA, Saibunkan 2004
 girl, Takeshobo 2004
 Fushigina Kuni no Risa (不思議な国のリサ), Bauhaus 2005
 Angel Collection Vol.16 Risa Shimamoto - digital
 Risa Shimamoto Digital Photo Book (島本里沙デジタル写真集)
 Risa Shimamoto Digital Photo Book Part 2 (島本里沙デジタル写真集 Part 2)

Serial essays
 KISSUI, Eichi Publishing
 Japo-richa Gakushucho: Risa Shimamoto's Dokidoki Shakaika Kengaku Report
 e-ONNA, G.O.T.
 Richa's Happy Life: Risa Shimamoto Whole Diary for a Month

External links

Official Site 
Richa's "Hot" Hitoiki  - Official Blog with her photographs, from November 2006 to April 2008
Risa Shimamoto's My Memories  - Former Official Blog with her photographs, from May to November 2006

1987 births
Living people
Japanese gravure models